James Aggrey Siang'a ( – 9 September 2016) was a Kenyan footballer. Also active as a football manager, he coached throughout Africa at both the club and national level, and coached Kenyan club side Gor Mahia.

Career

Playing career
Siang'a played as a goalkeeper and played at international level for Kenya. He played for Kenya at the 1972 African Cup of Nations finals.

Coaching career
Siang'a managed Kenya between 1999 and 2000. Siang'a then moved to Tanzania, where he was manager of the Tanzanian national team in 2002. Siang'a also managed Tanzanian club sides Simba SC and Moro United, as well as Express FC in Uganda. In October 2004, while at Moro United, Siang'a was approached to take over as manager of the Kenyan national team, but he refused. Later that same month, Siang'a was also approached to become manager of the Tanzanian national team; once again, he refused. Siang'a also coached Mtibwa Sugar in Tanzania, before becoming coach of Gor Mahia in Kenya.

Honours
CECAFA Clubs Cup – Simba SC (2002)

References

External links

1949 births
2016 deaths
Kenyan footballers
Kenya international footballers
1972 African Cup of Nations players
Gor Mahia F.C. players
Kenyan football managers
Kenya national football team managers
Expatriate football managers in Tanzania
Tanzania national football team managers
Association football goalkeepers
Kenyan expatriate football managers
Kenyan expatriate sportspeople in Tanzania
Expatriate football managers in Uganda
Kenyan expatriate sportspeople in Uganda
Simba S.C. managers